Sadd-e Karun Chahar (also Romanized as Sadd-e Kārūn Chahār) is a village in Abezhdan Rural District, Abezhdan District, Andika County, Khuzestan Province, Iran. At the 2006 census, its population was 22, in 9 families.

References 

Populated places in Andika County